Rhys Philip Elliot Murphy (born 6 November 1990) is a professional footballer who plays as a striker for  club Southend United.
 
He has played in the English Football League for Brentford, Preston North End, Dagenham & Redbridge, Oldham Athletic, Crawley Town, AFC Wimbledon, Forest Green Rovers and Gillingham.

Murphy represented his native England at under-16, under-17 and under-19 international levels, but switched allegiance to the Republic of Ireland in 2011 and played for their under-21 team.

Club career

Youth and Arsenal

Murphy was born in Shoreham-by-Sea, West Sussex. He broke into the Arsenal reserve team as a schoolboy, while also scoring 17 goals in 21 matches for the Arsenal Academy. He was previously an academy player for Wimbledon before joining Arsenal Academy. He signed his first professional contract in July 2008. He won the 2008–09 Premier Academy League with the Arsenal under-18 team, scoring the only goal in the play-off final versus Tottenham Hotspur, and the 2008–09 FA Youth Cup.

Brentford (loan)

He joined League One club Brentford on loan for three months on 24 November 2009.

In August 2011, Murphy had a trial with Scottish Premier League champions Rangers and played for their reserve team. In January 2012, he had a trial with Hibernian, another SPL club.

Preston North End (loan)

He signed for League One club Preston North End on loan until the end of the 2011–12 season.

On 22 May 2012, Murphy was released by Arsenal.

Telstar
Murphy joined Eerste Divisie club Telstar on 9 June 2012, signing a one-year contract with an option for a second. He made his debut on 10 August 2012 in a 2–1 home defeat to Helmond Sport. In the 67th minute, he was substituted for Leandro Resida who scored three minutes after.

Dagenham & Redbridge
He signed for League Two club Dagenham & Redbridge on 22 July 2013 on a two-year contract. He scored on his debut in the 3–1 defeat away to Fleetwood Town on 3 August 2013. He then scored his second goal for Dagenham in a 2–0 home win against York City the following week.

Oldham Athletic
On 2 February 2015, Murphy signed for League One club Oldham Athletic on a two-and-a-half-year contract for an undisclosed fee believed to be in the region of £20,000, to accelerate a pre-contract agreement set to activate in the 2015 summer transfer window. Manager Lee Johnson said of the arrival, "I'm really pleased to bring Rhys to the club and he is an exciting prospect for us, I'm looking forward to working with him and he will fit into our style of play seamlessly".

Crawley Town (loan)

He joined League Two club Crawley Town on 17 September 2015 on a 93-day loan.

Forest Green Rovers
On 7 July 2016, Murphy signed for National League club Forest Green Rovers for a nominal fee. His first goal for Forest Green came on 20 August 2016 in a 2–1 home win over York. He followed his first goal up by scoring twice in a 4–1 away victory over Maidstone United a week later on 27 August 2016.

York City (loan)

On 1 December 2016, Murphy joined Forest Green's divisional rivals York City on loan until 7 January 2017.

Crawley Town Return (loan)

On 31 January 2017, Murphy returned to League Two club Crawley Town on loan for the remainder of 2016–17. Five days later, Murphy made his Crawley return in a 2–1 home defeat against Stevenage, replacing Enzio Boldewijn with 12 minutes remaining.

Torquay United (loan)

On 19 September 2017, Murphy joined National League side Torquay United on a three-month loan deal. He had his contract with Forest Green cancelled by mutual consent on 9 January 2018.

Gillingham
Murphy signed for League One club Gillingham on 31 January 2018 on a short-term contract.

Chelmsford City
Murphy signed for National League South club Chelmsford City on 11 July 2018. On 26 December 2018, Murphy scored his first hat-trick for the club in a 5–1 win against rivals Billericay Town. Murphy was released by Chelmsford at the end of the 2018–19 season, having been the club's top scorer with 28 goals in all competitions.

Yeovil Town
Murphy signed for newly relegated National League club Yeovil Town on 26 June 2019 on a two-year contract.

Southend United
On 10 June 2021, after weeks of speculation, Murphy agreed a two-year deal to join recently relegated National League side Southend United, officially joining the club on 1 July 2021 upon the expiration of his Yeovil contract.

International career

England
Murphy has played for the England under-16 and under-17 teams and was part of under-19 squad that reached the final of 2009 UEFA European Under-19 Championship.

Republic of Ireland
Before playing for England, Murphy represented the Republic of Ireland at under-15 level and after an approach from Irish under-21 Head Coach Noel King, he switched his allegiance back to the country of his grandfather. He was called up to the under-21 squad in August 2011, and made his debut on 1 September 2011 against Hungary at the Showgrounds, scoring the winner in a 2–1 victory.

Career statistics

Honours
Arsenal
Premier Academy League: 2008–09
FA Youth Cup: 2008–09

AFC Wimbledon
Football League Two play-offs: 2016

England U19
UEFA European Under-19 Championship runner-up: 2009

Individual
Chelmsford City Player of the Year: 2018–19
Chelmsford City Players' Player of the Year: 2018–19
Chelmsford City Away Player of the Year: 2018–19

References

External links

Profile at the Yeovil Town F.C. website
Profile at the Football Association of Ireland website

1990 births
Living people
People from Shoreham-by-Sea
Footballers from West Sussex
English footballers
England youth international footballers
Republic of Ireland association footballers
Republic of Ireland youth international footballers
Republic of Ireland under-21 international footballers
Association football forwards
Wimbledon F.C. players
Arsenal F.C. players
Brentford F.C. players
Preston North End F.C. players
SC Telstar players
Dagenham & Redbridge F.C. players
Oldham Athletic A.F.C. players
Crawley Town F.C. players
AFC Wimbledon players
Forest Green Rovers F.C. players
York City F.C. players
Torquay United F.C. players
Gillingham F.C. players
Chelmsford City F.C. players
Yeovil Town F.C. players
Southend United F.C. players
English Football League players
Eerste Divisie players
National League (English football) players
English expatriate footballers
Republic of Ireland expatriate association footballers
Expatriate footballers in the Netherlands
English expatriate sportspeople in the Netherlands
Irish expatriate sportspeople in the Netherlands
English people of Irish descent